Girolamo Cardinal Grimaldi may refer to:

Girolamo Grimaldi (d. 1543)
Girolamo Grimaldi (d. 1733)